Ahmed Mahmoud Abdelkarim Al-Zuway (born 28 December 1982), better known better as Kabila, is a Libyan former footballer who played as a striker. He played club football for Al Naser, Al Ahly Benghazi, Al Qadisiya, Al Ittihad Tripoli, CA Bizertin, Al Sharjah, and Zakho FC, and international football for the Libya national team.

Career
On 2 October 2012, Zuway joined United Arab Emirates club Al Sharjah SC.

References

External links

Player Profile @ MTN African Cup of Nation 2006

1982 births
2006 Africa Cup of Nations players
Al-Ittihad Club (Tripoli) players
CA Bizertin players
Expatriate footballers in Tunisia
Expatriate footballers in Saudi Arabia
Expatriate footballers in the United Arab Emirates
Libyan expatriate sportspeople in Tunisia
Libyan expatriate sportspeople in Saudi Arabia
Libyan expatriate sportspeople in the United Arab Emirates
Living people
Libyan footballers
Sharjah FC players
Libyan expatriate footballers
Libya international footballers
2012 Africa Cup of Nations players
Al-Qadsiah FC players
Association football forwards
UAE First Division League players
Saudi Professional League players
Libyan Premier League players